Falizak (also Romanized as Fālīzak; also known as Pālīzak) is a village in Bagh-e Keshmir Rural District, Salehabad County, Razavi Khorasan Province, Iran. At the 2006 census, its population was 430, in 106 families.

References 

Populated places in   Torbat-e Jam County